City Cemetery, also known as the Sandersville Old City Cemetery, is located in Sandersville, Georgia.

History
Old City Cemetery began as the cemetery of the local Methodist Episcopal Church. Eventually the cemetery expanded to its current  which is surrounded by West Church Street to the South, West Haynes Street to the North, Virginia Avenue to the East, and private property to the West.

City Cemetery was listed on the National Register of Historic Places in 1987.

Notable interments
 Thomas W. Hardwick (1872–1944), a former U.S. senator and governor of Georgia
 Ben J. Tarbutton (1885–1962), state politician and mayor of Sandersville

References

External links
 
 

Cemeteries on the National Register of Historic Places in Georgia (U.S. state)
Gothic Revival architecture in Georgia (U.S. state)
1831 establishments in Georgia (U.S. state)
Protected areas of Washington County, Georgia
National Register of Historic Places in Washington County, Georgia